Kumudam is a Tamil weekly magazine published in Chennai, India. It was founded in 1948 by S.A.P. Annamalai, and his close friend and confidante P.V. Parthasarathy. Now the magazine is published under the Kumudam Group, which also publishes other Tamil magazines including Kumudam Reporter, Kumudam Snehidi, Kumudam Bhakti, Kumudam Jothidam, Kumudam Theeranadhi. The Kumudam Group started a Telugu spiritual magazine called Kumudam Bhakthi Special.

It had a circulation of 620,000 copies in 1986. The web site kumudam.com attracted over 66,000 visitors in 2008 according to a Compete.com survey.

Criticism
In September 2015, Kumudam came under criticism when an article published in Kumudam Reporter had criticised women wearing leggings. The women's pictures used in the article were reportedly printed without consent. The article received considerable social media attention, resulting in a petition on Change.org, which received over 17,500 signatures.

References

External links
Kumudam website

Weekly magazines published in India
Magazines established in 1947
Tamil-language magazines
1947 establishments in India
Mass media in Chennai
Companies based in Chennai